Teplice (until 1948 Teplice-Šanov) is a city in the Ústí nad Labem Region of the Czech Republic. It has about 49,000 inhabitants. It is the second largest Czech spa town, after Karlovy Vary. The historic city centre is well preserved and is protected by law as an urban monument zone.

Administrative parts

The municipal area comprises the administrative parts of Teplice proper, Hudcov, Nová Ves, Prosetice, Řetenice, Sobědruhy and Trnovany.

Etymology
The name Teplice is an Old Czech word, meaning "hot spring".

Geography
The northern part of the municipal territory lies in the Most Basin, the southern part lies in the Central Bohemian Uplands. There are several small fish ponds in the territory.

History
According to the 1541 Annales Bohemorum by chronicler Wenceslaus Hajek, the thermal springs are fabled to have been discovered as early as 762; however, the first authentic mention of the baths occurred in the 16th century. The settlement of Trnovany was first documented in a 1057 deed, while Teplice proper was first mentioned in 1154, when Judith of Thuringia, queen consort of King Vladislaus II of Bohemia, founded a Benedictine convent near the hot springs, the second in Bohemia. A fortified town arose around the monastery, which was destroyed in the course of the Hussite Wars after the 1426 Battle of Aussig. In the late 15th century, queen consort Joanna of Rožmitál, wife of King George of Poděbrady, had a castle erected on the ruins.

Teplice figures in the history of the Thirty Years' War, when it was a possession of the Protestant Bohemian noble Vilém Kinský, who was assassinated together with Generalissimo Albrecht von Wallenstein at Cheb in 1634. The Habsburg emperor Ferdinand II thereafter enfeoffed castle and town to his general Johann von Aldringen, who nevertheless was killed in battle in the same year, and Teplice fell to his sister Anna Maria von Clary-Aldringen. Consequently, and until 1945, Teplice Castle was the primarily seat of the princely House of Clary-Aldringen. After the Thirty Years' War, the devastated town was the destination of many German settlers.

After a blaze in 1793, large parts of the town were rebuilt in a Neoclassical style. The health resort was a popular venue for wealthy bourgeois like the poet Johann Gottfried Seume, who died on his stay in 1810, or Ludwig van Beethoven, who met here with Johann Wolfgang von Goethe in 1812; as well as for European monarchs. During the Napoleonic War of the Sixth Coalition, Teplice in August 1813 was the site where Emperor Francis I of Austria, Emperor Alexander I of Russia and King Frederick William III of Prussia first signed the triple alliance against Napoleon I of France that led to the coalition victory at the nearby Battle of Kulm.

In 1895, Teplice merged with neighbouring Lázně Šanov (Schönau). Upon the dissolution of Austria-Hungary after World War I and the 1919 Treaty of Saint-Germain-en-Laye, the predominantly German-speaking population found itself in newly established Czechoslovakia. According to the 1930 census there were 30 799 people living in the city (5,232 persons of Czechoslovak ethnicity, 12 persons of Hungarian ethnicity, 23 127 persons of German ethnicity and 667 of Jewish ethnicity).  Right-wing political groups like the German National Socialist Worker's Party referred to themselves as Volksdeutsche and began to urge for a unification with Germany, their efforts laid the foundation for the rise of the Sudeten German Party under Konrad Henlein after 1933. With the Sudetenland, Teplice was annexed by Nazi Germany according to the 1938 Munich Agreement and incorporated into Reichsgau Sudetenland. In 1930, 3,213 Jews lived in Teplice, 10% of the population. Under the Nazi regime they faced the Holocaust in the Sudetenland. Many fled and the Teplice Synagogue was burnt during Kristallnacht.

After World War II the Czechoslovak government enacted the Beneš decrees, whereafter the German-speaking majority of the population was expelled from Teplice. In 1945, the Princes of Clary-Aldringen, lords of Teplice since 1634, were expropriated.

In 1994, Jaroslav Kubera of the ODS became mayor of Teplice and he held the position until 2018.

Demographics

Economy

The largest employer based in the city is AGC Flat Glass Czech, a manufacturer of flat glass for the construction and automotive industries.

Spa
One of the most important employers is the spa. The thermal mineral springs were mentioned already in 1154, which makes the spa the oldest in the country and Central Europe. The Pravřídlo spring reaches a temperature of 41° C. The spa focuses on treatment of musculoskeletal disorders, nervous system diseases, and vascular diseases.

Sport
Teplice is home to the professional football club FK Teplice playing in the Czech First League. The stadium Na Stínadlech is one of the largest in the country and has hosted international matches.

Sights

The main landmark is Teplice Castle. It houses a regional museum with historic castle interiors and a library. In the inner courtyard of the castle, there is a unique Romanesque exposition with the remains of Queen Judith and the remains of a Romanesque basilica with a rarely preserved Romanesque crypt. Adjoining the castle is a large castle garden.

The Church of Saint John the Baptist is a baroque building from 1594, rebuilt in 1703 to its current form. Its tower is open to the public and serves as a lookout tower.

The neo-Gothic Church of Saint Bartholomew was built in 1884 for German population of Lutheran faith. After their expulsion, the church changed owners several times and ceased to serve its purpose. Today it is conserved as a cultural monument and there are expositions concerning the history of the Jewish community in Teplice, and other.

Doubravka Castle is a castle ruin located in Trnovany part of Teplice. It was built in 1483 and conquered in 1639 during the Thirty Years' War. The castle began to serve as a destination for walks and in the 19th century, a restaurant and the neo-Gothic extension were built. Today there is a restaurant and a private lookout tower.

Paleontology
Fossils of an elasmosaurid plesiosaur (large carnivorous marine reptile from the Cretaceous period) were found near Teplice at the end of the 19th century. In the village of Hudcov (a part of Teplice), plesiosaur Cimoliasaurus teplicensis was described in 1906 by Czech paleontologist Antonín Frič.

Notable people

Julius von Payer (1841–1915), arctic explorer
August Stradal (1860–1930), pianist
Karl Pohlig (1864–1928), conductor
Prince Siegfried von Clary-Aldringen (1848–1920), Austro-Hungarian diplomat
Humbert Achamer-Pifrader (1900–1945), SS Colonel
Paul Kohner (1902–1988), film producer
Frederick Kohner (1905–1986), writer
Marianne Winder (1918–2001), librarian
Felix Holzmann (1921–2001), comedian
Helmut Pfleger (born 1943), chess grandmaster
Jaromír Kohlíček (1953–2020), politician
Daniela Peštová (born 1970), model
Robert Lang (born 1970), ice hockey player
Lucie Králová (born 1982), Miss Czech Republic 2005

Residents

Adam Adamandy Kochański (1631–1700), mathematician, died here
Johann Gottfried Seume (1763–1810), poet, died here
Ludwig van Beethoven (1770–1827), composer, began writing his Symphony No. 7 here in 1812
Novalis (1772–1801), poet and philosopher, wrote his "Teplitz Fragments" while staying here
Karl Ludwig von Ficquelmont (1777–1857), Austrian diplomat and statesman, resided here at his daughter's castle
Dorothea de Ficquelmont (1804–1863), died here at her daughter's castle
Richard Wagner (1813–1883), began composing the music to his opera Tannhäuser here during a vacation in 1843
Adolf Kurrein (1846–1919), rabbi of Teplice from 1888
Count Manfred von Clary-Aldringen (1852–1928), Austro-Hungarian statesman, resided here in his family's castle
Otto Tetens (1865–1945), astronomer, died here
Oscar Straus (1870–1954) worked here as a Kapellmeister
Ruth von Mayenburg (1907–1993), writer, grew up here
Kurt Eichhorn (1908–1994), conductor, worked here
František Fajtl (1912–2006), fighter pilot in WWII and writer, studied here in 1928–1932

References

External links

Historical Maps "Herrschaft Toeplitz" & Streetmap Toeplitz with different Views (A. F. Zuerner, Amsterdam, 18th century)
Audioguide through Teplice

 
Populated places in Teplice District
Cities and towns in the Czech Republic
Spa towns in the Czech Republic
Burial sites of the Ludovingians